Wind power in North Carolina is found along the coastal areas in the east and mountain regions in the western part of the state. The state has significant offshore wind resources. In 2015, small scale wind turbine projects were found throughout the state. In 2016, North Carolina's first large scale wind project, and the first in the southeastern U.S., was completed near Elizabeth City.

In 2019, North Carolina had an installed wind capacity of 208 MW.

NASA wind turbine
In 1977, the Federal Energy Research and Development Administration and the Department of Energy announced that Howard Knob had been selected as the site for an experimental wind turbine, which was later built by General Electric in October 1978. The project was part of a surge in renewable energy research which began under then-President Jimmy Carter. The turbine, formally known as MOD-1, was managed by NASA and operated by Blue Ridge Electric Membership Corporation.

Permitting of Wind Energy Facilities
The Permitting of Wind Energy Facilities law enacted in 2013 requires the state Department of Environment and Natural Resources to issue a permit before a wind energy operation can begin, providing a framework to assist wind developers in identifying suitable locations for wind energy facilities outlines and the steps that follow in the permitting process.

Land-based

Wind for Schools
Sponsored by the Department of Energy, the Wind for Schools program has installed small scale wind turbines for educational use at schools throughout state to encourages the incorporation of renewable energy education into the K-12 science curriculum. Appalachian State installed four turbines in 2011 at schools in the mountains including Alleghany High, Avery High, Watauga High, & North Wilkes Middle. Five turbines were installed on the coast at JP Knapp, Cape Hatteras Secondary School, First Flight High School, as well at the College of The Albemarle at Dare and at Edenton. Progress Energy Carolinas sponsored the 2-kilowatt wind turbine at Hot Springs Elementary School, another at Madison High School, and a third at the Madison County Cooperative Extension Office.

Amazon Wind Farm East
The Desert Wind Wind Energy Project proposed by Atlantic Wind was completed in 2016. The project comprises 104 wind turbines (208 MW) within a 2,513-acre portion of a 24,242-acre review area located 7.5 miles west of Elizabeth City.

Off-shore

Capacity
In 2009, on behalf of the North Carolina General Assembly the University of North Carolina at Chapel Hill conducted a 9-month study to assess the feasibility of installing wind turbines in the sounds and off the coast of North Carolina. In June 2010, the National Renewable Energy Laboratory found that North Carolina had the largest resource potential of any state on the East Coast with had 297 GW of offshore wind capacity within 50 miles of the coast.

Offshore Wind Energy Areas (WEA)
They are Kitty Hawk Wind Energy Areas, the Wilmington West Wind Energy Areas and the Wilmington East Wind Energy Areas.

Additional wind studies

Wind generation 

Source:

See also 

Solar power in North Carolina
Wind power in the United States
List of wind farms in the United States
List of offshore wind farms in the United States

References

External links 
BOEM North Carolina
NC Consumers Guide
GENERAL ASSEMBLY OF NORTH CAROLINA SESSION 2013 SESSION LAW 2013-51 HOUSE BILL 484
2009 Wind Energy Study